Maximiliano Cipriano Jones (1871–1944) was a Fernandino who became the richest black planter of the island Fernando Po, Spanish Guinea in 1929.

Legacy

His son, Wilwardo Jones, was also a planter on the island.

References

1871 births
1944 deaths
Fernandino people
Equatoguinean farmers